Jacques Stroucken (1 December 1884 - 8 July 1975) was a Dutch painter.

References

1884 births
1975 deaths
Dutch painters